Webula is a village in Falam Township, Falam District Chin State, Myanmar,  east of the town of Falam on the Tedim Road.

External links
 
 
 

Populated places in Chin State